Wolfgang-Ernst Ferdinand Heinrich Franz Karl Georg Wilhelm, VIII. Prince of Ysenburg and Büdingen in Wächtersbach (born 20 June 1936 in Frankfurt am Main) is a German aristocrat. He is currently head of the House of Ysenburg and Büdingen.

From 1992 to 2008 he was the president of the Automobilclub von Deutschland (AvD). He is a diploma-merchant and was responsible for the private clients transactions of the DG-Bank for many years.

Family 
Wolfgang-Ernst is the first of five children of His Serene Highness, Otto-Friedrich III. Friedrich Viktor Ferdinand Maximilian Gustav Richard Bogislav, Prince of Ysenburg and Büdingen, and Her Serene Highness Felicitas Anna Eleonore Cecilie, née Princess Reuss zu Köstritz. In 1967, he married Leonille Elisabeth Victoria Barbara Margarete Princess of Sayn-Wittgenstein-Berleburg, the daughter of the bursar of the leading German political partie CDU Casimir Johannes Prince of Sayn-Wittgenstein-Berleburg. They have three children and live at Büdingen Castle.

Children:
 Casimir Alexander, Hereditary Prince of Ysenburg and Büdingen (b. 1967), m. Alexandra Maria, Countess von Bernstorff (b. 1977)
 Tristan-Alexander (b. 2014)
 Ferdinand Maximilian (b. 1969), m. Sophie de Bois (b. 1970)
 Madeleine (b. 2004)
 Tassilo-Alexander (b. 2006)
 Felizitas (b. 1980)

President of the AvD 
In May 1992, he was elected unsalaried president of the AvD as the successor of Paul Alfons von Metternich-Winneburg. In his term of office, the company has developed into a service company and has significantly expanded its services. In 1999, the club celebrated its centennial of existence. After the suspicion could not be eliminated at a special meeting of the club on 6 April 2008, he resign for the first June 2008. This followed investigations by the public prosecutor Frankfurt were on suspicion of disloyalty to the detriment of the club members.

Economic downfall 
In 1990, Wolfgang Ernst took on the extensive business enterprises of the house by his father Otto Friedrich Prince of Ysenburg. In the following period, due to bad investments and bad speculation, there was a financial collapse and a large part of the Princely property had to be sold.  In 2005 at the district court Friedberg an insolvency proceeding on the forest enterprise of the Princely house was opened. The 8500-hectare forest of Büdingen – one of the largest private forest properties in Hesse – could be sold to an investor, but this has not alleviated the financial problems of the prince. Back in 2001, a tradition since 1578 Princely brewery was sold in Waechtersbach at the Würzburg Hofbräuhaus. 2005 was followed by the sale of the 175-year-old Waechtersbacher Keramik which was soon bankrupt. At the same time appeared cultural goods, such as ancient manuscripts and folios on from the possession of the house in the auction trade. 2011 reported the family company, Beteiligungsgesellschaft Fürst zu Ysenburg und Büdingen GmbH & Co., whose managing director Wolfgang-Ernst was, was also in bankruptcy.

He had to sell most of his estates, including Wächtersbach Castle, but kept Büdingen Castle and in 2010 repurchased Ronneburg Castle.

Investigation 
As head of the family of the house Ysenburg and Büdingen, Wolfgang Ernst acts as director of the foundation "Präsenz zu Büdingen", to their extensive possession for centuries belongs two churches (including the Church of St. Mary) and the cemetery of Büdingen town. The foundation is obliged to conserve these buildings. During his tenure there were transfers of assets within which Wolfgang Ernst graduated in two properties agreements with himself. The Evangelical Church in Hesse and Nassau accused him of having acted to the detriment of the Foundation and in favor of the ailing family fortune and requested the President of the Government in Darmstadt in April 2012 to dismiss Wolfgang-Ernst as the foundation trustee. The prosecution of Gießen started investigations on grounds of a suspicion of infidelity.

Honors and work 
In 2001 of Ysenburg and Büdingen got the Order of Merit of the Federal Republic of Germany (1st class) for his volunteer work. He is the president of the Foundation "Mathilden-Hospital", and engaged himself social in the Förderverein Collegium musicum in Mainz, in the direction of the club Freunde der Universität Mainz and he is the president of the EuropaChorAkademie. In his AvD time he awarded the trophy of the German Grand Prix.

Ancestry

References

External links 
 Genealogy

1936 births
Living people
Princes of Ysenburg and Büdingen
Businesspeople from Frankfurt
Officers Crosses of the Order of Merit of the Federal Republic of Germany